Jaime Santos (born October 8, 1951), professionally known as Jimmy Santos, is a Filipino actor, comedian, TV host, former professional basketball player and vlogger. He is one of the hosts from Eat Bulaga since 1983.

Basketball career
Prior to his acting career, Santos became one of the "starting five" players of Jose Rizal College Heavy Bombers in which they had won a 1972 NCAA Championship together with Philip Cezar and David Cezar. He would later play for the U/tex Weavers in the commercial league MICAA, the PBA's forerunner. Santos also played thirteen games in the PBA's inaugural season (1975) for the 7-Up Uncolas. In the featured Old-timers game during the 1991 PBA All-Star week, Santos was named MVP for his late-game heroics and hijinks on the court, leading his White team over the Blue team.

Showbiz career
After a one-season stint with the 7-Up Uncolas in the PBA, Santos began appearing in serious movie supporting roles in the 1970s. His debut movie was Bontoc with the late action King Fernando Poe, Jr., and his other movies including Little Christmas Tree. In the 1980s he turned to comedy, and became a regular in the Philippine television series Iskul Bukol and T.O.D.A.S.: Television's Outrageously Delightful All-Star Show. He also became a regular host in the noon-time television variety show Eat Bulaga! until 2022. Since then, he starred as lead comic actor in such feature films as I Love You 3X a Day, Bondying (a remake), Wooly Booly, and Humanap Ka ng Panget.

In 2011, Santos played a supporting role alongside Vice Ganda in The Unkabogable Praybeyt Benjamin, which gained the distinction of being the highest-grossing Filipino film of all time.

In 2013, he returned to action via Bang Bang Alley with co-star Megan Young.

In 2015, Santos returned to comedy via the film The Illegal Wife with co-stars Zanjoe Marudo and Pokwang.

Santos's most recent film is TOL in 2019 with co-stars Enchong Dee and Jessy Mendiola.

Personal life
Jimmy has 3 children, a daughter and 2 sons, his youngest also following the footsteps of his father as a basketball player. He finished banking and finance at the Jose Rizal College (now Jose Rizal University).

In 2021, Santos started a YouTube channel under the name "Jimmy Saints" where he covers vignettes about his life.

Filmography

Film

Television

Bawal Na Game Show (TV5, 2021)
Fill in the Bank (TV5, 2021)
All-Out Sundays (GMA Network, 2020) - guest
Mars Pa More (GMA Network, 2020) - guest
Ikigai: Eat Bulaga Lenten Drama Special 2019 (GMA Network, 2019 Post Production) - shot entirely in Tokyo, Japan
The Boobay and Tekla Show (GMA Network, 2019)
Daddy's Gurl (GMA Network, 2018)
Hay, Bahay! (GMA Network, 2017)
Dear Uge (GMA Network, 2016)
Sabado Badoo (GMA Network, 2015) - cameo guest featured footage
Biro Ng Kapalaran: Eat Bulaga Lenten Drama Special 2015 (GMA Network, 2015 Post Production)
Anyo Ng Pag-Ibig: Eat Bulaga Lenten Drama Special 2014 (GMA Network, 2014 Post Production)
Vampire Ang Daddy Ko (GMA Network, March 9, 2013 – June 12, 2016)
"Mars" (GMA News TV 27, 2012)
The Jose and Wally Show Starring Vic Sotto (TV5, 2011–2012)
Gandang Gabi, Vice (ABS-CBN, 2011)
Maalaala Mo Kaya: "Langis" (ABS-CBN, 2011)
5 Star Specials (TV5, 2011)
Talentadong Pinoy (TV5, 2010)
Love Bug Presents (GMA Network, 2010)
Pepito Manaloto (GMA Network, 2011)
Maynila (GMA Network, 2009)
Obra Presents (GMA Network, 2008)
Ang Mga Anak Ng Maestro: Eat Bulaga Special (GMA Network, 2008) (TV)
Bahay Mo Ba 'To? (GMA Network, 2007) (TV)
Ganyan Kita Kamahal: Eat Bulaga Special (GMA Network, 2007) (TV)
A Telefantastic Christmas: The GMA All-Star Spcecial (GMA Network, 2005) (TV)
Magpakailanman: The Yoyoy Villame Story (GMA Network, 2005)
True Love: Eat Bulaga Special (GMA Network, 2005) (TV)
Idol Ko si Kap (GMA Network, 2001)
Campus Romance (GMA Network, 2000)
GMA Love Stories (GMA Network, 1999)
Dear Mikee (GMA Network, 1998)
Spotlight Drama Specials (GMA Network, 1995)
Mikee (GMA Network, 1994)
Oki Doki Doc (ABS-CBN, 1993)
Coney Reyes on Camera (ABS-CBN)
GMA Telesine Specials (GMA Network)
Eat Bulaga! (RPN, ABS-CBN, GMA Network, 1980–2022)
Lovingly Yours, Helen (GMA Network)
Stay Awake (TV5)
Rock & Roll 2000 (TV5)
T.S.C.S. (The Sharon Cuneta Show) (ABS-CBN, 1993-1995)
Purungtong (RPN, 1993)
Vilma On Seven (GMA Network, 1993)
Doon Po Sa Amin (RPN, 1993)
Gabi ni Dolphy (RPN, 1992)
Idol Si Pidol (TV5, 1992)
The Dawn & Jimmy Show (IBC, 1989)
Maricel Drama Special (ABS-CBN, 1989)
TVJ: Television Jesters (IBC, 1989)
Plaza 1899 (RPN, 1987)
T.O.D.A.S.: Television's Outrageously Delightful All-Star Show (IBC, 1987-1989)
Joey & Son (RPN, 1980)
C.U.T.E (IBC, 1977)
John en Marsha (RPN, 1977-1990) - Guest
Iskul Bukol (IBC, 1977)

References

External links

Jimmy Santos on Eat Bulaga! site

1951 births
Living people
ABS-CBN personalities
Barangay Ginebra San Miguel players
Basketball players from Metro Manila
Filipino male comedians
Filipino male television actors
Filipino male film actors
Filipino men's basketball players
Filipino television variety show hosts
Filipino YouTubers
GMA Network personalities
Intercontinental Broadcasting Corporation personalities
Tagalog people
Male actors from Metro Manila
JRU Heavy Bombers basketball players
People from Pateros
Radio Philippines Network personalities
Shooting guards
Small forwards
TV5 (Philippine TV network) personalities
YouTube channels launched in 2016
YouTube vloggers